Willy Olsen (25 January 1921 – 14 September 1995) was a Norwegian footballer. He played in ten matches for the Norway national football team from 1949 to 1956. He was also named in Norway's squad for the Group 1 qualification tournament for the 1954 FIFA World Cup.

References

External links
 

1921 births
1995 deaths
Norwegian footballers
Norway international footballers
Place of birth missing
Association footballers not categorized by position